Podhořany u Ronova is a municipality and village in Chrudim District in the Pardubice Region of the Czech Republic. It has about 200 inhabitants.

Administrative parts
Villages of Bílý Kámen and Nový Dvůr are administrative parts of Podhořany u Ronova.

History
The first written mention of Podhořany u Ronova is from 1356, when there was a fort.

References

External links

Villages in Chrudim District